The Nehemiah P. Clarke House is a historic house in St. Cloud, Minnesota, United States.  It was built in 1893 for Nehemiah P. Clarke (1836–1912), who arrived in St. Cloud as a pioneer in 1856 and made his fortune in retail, lumbering, and other business ventures.  The house was listed on the National Register of Historic Places in 1982 for its local significance in the themes of architecture and commerce.  It was nominated for its outstanding Queen Anne architecture and its association with Clarke.

See also

 National Register of Historic Places listings in Stearns County, Minnesota

References

1893 establishments in Minnesota
Buildings and structures in St. Cloud, Minnesota
Houses completed in 1893
Houses in Stearns County, Minnesota
Houses on the National Register of Historic Places in Minnesota
National Register of Historic Places in Stearns County, Minnesota
Queen Anne architecture in Minnesota